Pseudoboletus parasiticus, previously known as Boletus parasiticus and Xerocomus parasiticus, and commonly known as the parasitic bolete, is a rare Boletaceae mushroom found on earthballs (Scleroderma citrinum).  Pseudoboletus parasiticus is one of the earliest-diverging lineages of the Boletaceae, after the clade comprising Chalciporus and Buchwaldoboletus.

Description
The cap is hemispherical when young, later flat, yellowish brown or darker and up to 5 cm in diameter. The flesh is pale yellow and the spores are olive.
The stem is pale yellow to olive. While edible, it is of poor quality.

See also
List of Boletus species
List of North American boletes

References

Further reading 

 E. Garnweidner. Mushrooms and Toadstools of Britain and Europe. Collins. 1994.

parasiticus
parasiticus
Edible fungi
Fungi of Europe